Philip Salvatore Portoghese (born June 4, 1931) is an American medicinal chemist who has made notable contributions to the design and synthesis of ligands targeting opioid receptors. He is a Distinguished Professor of Medicinal Chemistry at the University of Minnesota, Twin Cities. He also served as the Editor-in-chief of the Journal of Medicinal Chemistry from 1972 to 2012, when the job was taken on by his departmental colleague, Gunda I. Georg, who shares the Editor-in-chief position with Shaomeng Wang at the University of Michigan.

Biography
Portoghese was born on June 4, 1931 in Brooklyn, New York. He received a B.S. in pharmacy at Columbia University and then went on to obtain an M.S. degree in physical pharmacy in 1958. He continued his graduate studies at the University of Wisconsin–Madison and obtained a Ph.D in pharmaceutical chemistry under the mentorship of Edward E. Smissman in 1961. He joined the faculty of the Department of Medicinal Chemistry at University of Minnesota in 1961, where he has served with distinction for over five decades. He is known internationally for designing several opioid ligands including β-funaltrexamine, naltrindole, norbinaltorphimine, and naltriben. He has pioneered the use of bivalent ligands to target opioid receptor complexes called heteromers. He was honored in 2011 for 50 years of exemplary academic service by the University of Minnesota. In 2007, he was inducted into the Hall of Fame of the American Chemical Society (ACS) Division of Medicinal Chemistry. Portoghese served as Editor-in-chief of the Journal of Medicinal Chemistry from 1972 to 2012, making him one of the longest standing editors of an ACS journal.

Awards
Portoghese has been a recipient of numerous awards including:

1980 	A.Ph.A./Academy of Pharmaceutical Sciences Research Achievement Award in Medicinal Chemistry
1984 	American Association of Colleges of Pharmacy Ernest H. Volweiler Award for Outstanding Contributions to Research in the Pharmaceutical Sciences
1986 	University of Catania honorary doctorate 
1990 	Division of Medicinal Chemistry, American Chemistry Society: Medicinal Chemistry Award 
1990 	Am. Assoc. of Pharmaceutical Scientists: Research Achievement Award in Medicinal Chemistry 
1991 	College on Problems of Drug Dependence, NAS-NRC: N.B. Eddy Award for Excellence in Drug Abuse Research
1991 	Division of Medicinal Chemistry, Am. Chem. Soc.: E.E. Smissman-Bristol-Myers-Squibb Award
1992 	Royal Danish School of Pharmacy, Copenhagen: Honorary Doctorate 
1996 	University of Wisconsin: Citation of Merit
1997-2006 	National Institutes of Health: MERIT (Method to Extend Research In Time) Award
1999 	Rho Chi Pharmacy Honor Society Award
1999 	The Oak & the Tulip Medal, Società Chimica Italiana, and the European Federation for Medicinal Chemistry
2000 	American Chemical Society: Alfred Burger Award in Medicinal Chemistry
2000	University of Minnesota: Distinguished Professor
2000 	University of Minnesota: Citation of Excellence in Teaching, Research, and Service
2001 	University of Minnesota: Weaver Medal, University of Minnesota, College of Pharmacy
2003 	University of Minnesota: Academy for Excellence in Health Research, Academic Health Center
2006 	European Federation of Medicinal Chemistry: Nauta Award in Pharmacochemistry
2007 	Member, Medicinal Chemistry Hall of Fame, Div. of Medicinal Chemistry, Am. Chem. Society
2010 -American Chemical Society established the P.S. Portoghese Lecture, presented annually by the A.C.S. Division of Medicinal Chemistry
2015 -American Pharmaceutical Association, Academy of Pharmaceutical Sciences, Takeru Higuchi Research Prize

References

External links 
 Portoghese lab page 

1931 births
University of Wisconsin–Madison alumni
University of Minnesota faculty
Living people